Albert Gray (23 September 1900 – 16 December 1969) was a Welsh international footballer who played as goalkeeper for various clubs in the 1920s and 1930s, including Oldham Athletic, Manchester City, Tranmere Rovers and Chester. For his country, he made 24 appearances between 1924 and 1938, helping Wales win the British Home Championship three times.

Football career

Club career
Gray was born in Tredegar, Monmouthshire and first came to the attention of scouts from the Football League when he stood in for the injured goalkeeper for a local colliery side. He spent two years with Ebbw Vale during which time the club won the Southern League Welsh Section in 1921–22, going one better the following year to win the Southern League championship.

Standing at 6 ft 3ins, Gray was one of the tallest players at the time and used his height to great effect; he was described as "a very capable goalkeeper, (who) was cool and safe and inspired confidence in his defenders".

In May 1923, he moved to the Football League Second Division with Oldham Athletic where he remained for four seasons, making over 100 first-team appearances before joining fellow Second Division club, Manchester City for a fee of £2,250 in January 1927, where he displaced long-term custodians Jim Goodchild and James Mitchell. He soon became a regular for his new club, helping them to win the Second Division title in 1927–28.

By the end of the first season in the First Division, Gray was out of favour at Maine Road and in August 1929 he was loaned for a season to the short-lived Manchester Central club. There then followed a year with Coventry City where he never played a first-team game, before joining Tranmere Rovers. Gray spent five seasons at the Prenton Park club, during which they twice reached the final of the Welsh Cup, losing to Bristol City in 1934, but winning the trophy the following year with a 1–0 victory over Chester.

In 1936, he applied for the manager's job at Tranmere but was turned down and moved to fellow Third Division North club, Chester. After a brief spell in Ireland at Waterford in 1938, Gray wound up his career in the Cheshire League with Congleton Town.

International career
Gray made his international debut for Wales in the 1924 British Home Championship match against Scotland on 16 February 1924. The game at Ninian Park, Cardiff ended in a 2–0 victory for Wales, with goals from Willie Davies and Len Davies. Gray retained his place for the next two matches with victories over England and Ireland, thus enabling Wales to take the British Home Championship trophy for the second time in five years. Gray only missed four Wales international matches between February 1924 and October 1929 during which time Wales again claimed the Championship trophy under captain Fred Keenor.

On 28 November 1927, Gray featured in an eventful match against England at Burnley's Turf Moor ground, involving two own goals and a missed penalty. Wales opened the scoring with a goal from Wilf Lewis followed by an own goal by England's captain, Jack Hill, playing at his home stadium. In the second half, Roy Goodall had the chance to bring England back into the game but missed his penalty. When England finally scored, this was also an own goal as Fred Keenor deflected Louis Page's corner past Gray in the Wales goal. (Some sources claim that it was Gray himself who turned the ball into the net.)

In the summer of 1929, the Football Association of Wales sent a party of players to tour Canada, with Gray and Len Evans sharing the goalkeeping duties. In an article welcoming the touring party, The Montreal Gazette described Gray as "well equipped for the position as he stands 6 feet 3 inches and should have little difficulty reaching high shots." Gray was "in the glory of his manhood at 29 years of age. His goalkeeping has been described as "majestic" and there is no exaggeration in this word". During the tour, Wales played 15 matches in five weeks, winning them all with 61 goals scored and only ten conceded.

During the two years between November 1929 and October 1931, Wales called upon several keepers, including Cardiff City's Len Evans and Wrexham's Dick Finnigan, who was called up for the match against Ireland in February 1930 because Manchester City refused to release Gray. (The Irish won this match 7–0, with six goals from Joe Bambrick.)

Gray returned to the side for three matches in October/November 1931, in the 1932 British Home Championship. Gray was appointed captain in Keenor's absence for the match against Scotland on 31 October; despite "(keeping) goal in fine style", Gray conceded three goals with the Welsh only managing two in reply from Ernie Curtis.

For five seasons, between October 1932 and March 1936, Roy John played in goal for Wales, before Gray received a recall for the match against England on 17 October 1936. Gray retained his place for five matches and helped Wales take the British Home Championship once again. His final international appearance came against Ireland on 16 March 1938 when Gray was in his 38th year.

International appearances
Gray made 24 appearances for Wales in official international matches, as follows:

Later career
Gray was a keen golfer and won the Merseyside Footballers' title in 1933, 1934 and 1936.

During the Second World War, he was a sergeant-instructor with South-Eastern Command. In October 1942, he was goalkeeper for a South-Eastern Command team composed of professional footballers, including England internationals Bert Sproston, Cliff Britton and Albert Geldard, who played a 0–0 draw at Erith. After the war, Gray became a bookmaker at Cleveleys, near Blackpool. He died in Blackpool on 16 December 1969.

In April 2009, Gray's archives and collection of memorabilia were put up for auction; his caps, medals and photographs raised in excess of £4,000. Several of the items were acquired by the Welsh National Football Collection, including his League medal from 1923, a Wales Football Team Badge, two medals from the Canadian tour of 1929, one of Gray's international caps and Gray's shirt from his final international appearance.

Honours
Ebbw Vale
Southern League Welsh Section winners: 1921–22, 1922–23
Southern League champions: 1922–23
Manchester City
Football League Second Division champions: 1927–28
Tranmere Rovers
Welsh Cup winners: 1935
Welsh Cup finalists: 1934

Wales
British Home Championship winners: 1923–24, 1927–28, 1936–37

References

External links

Picture of Gray in action
Wales team photo from March 1924 in which Gray is prominent

1900 births
Sportspeople from Tredegar
1969 deaths
Welsh footballers
Association football goalkeepers
Ebbw Vale F.C. players
Oldham Athletic A.F.C. players
Manchester City F.C. players
Manchester Central F.C. players
Coventry City F.C. players
Tranmere Rovers F.C. players
Chester City F.C. players
Waterford F.C. players
Congleton Town F.C. players
Wales international footballers